African Queen (also known as S/L Livingstone) was the name of two boats used in the 1951 movie The African Queen starring Humprey Bogart and Katharine Hepburn. It was filmed in the Belgian Congo on a tributary of the Congo River, and on the Nile in the Murchison Falls National Park in Uganda. Two boats were utilised, one in each location. One of the boats is now located in Key Largo, Florida and on February 18, 1992, was added to the U.S. National Register of Historic Places. The other is located in Jinja, Uganda.

History

The Congo boat
This African Queen was a 30-foot steam boat built of riveted sheet iron in 1912 in the United Kingdom for service in Africa on the Victoria Nile and Lake Albert where the movie was filmed in 1950. Originally named Livingstone, she was built for the British East Africa Railway and used from 1912 to 1968. It spent most of its first 50 years operating in the waters of the Ruki River in the northern Democratic Republic of Congo where she was used to transport hunters, mercenaries, and cargo.

According to an article on its 2012 restoration, it was built by Lytham Shipbuilding and Engineering Co., as evidenced by the boiler plate and Lancashire records.

The boat was found in Cairo, Egypt in the 1970s, with coal still in its bilges. Purchased and shipped to the United States, it has had a succession of owners and is currently held in trust. It was refurbished in 2012, including installation of an interior steel hull frame and new boiler, and restored to service as a tourist boat.

The Nile boat
The other African Queen was built in 1950 for the film purposes and was discovered by Yank Evans, a Patagonian mechanical engineer who'd come across what was left of the vessel while working on the roads in Murchison Falls National Park, Uganda in 1984. "Yank came across a carcass of a steel boat, in the bushes there just left to rot. He asked the locals what this was and they said well that's the African Queen. So he bought it off the National Parks for $1." Evans, who had worked on the boat with his son Billy and gave her a steam engine then stored the boat when he moved to Kenya in 1997 and her new home became a trailer in the garden.

Cam McLeay, a Kiwi who lived in Uganda for ten years with his family, purchased the Nile African Queen after hearing her story and set to finishing the restorations and getting the boat's original steam engine functioning and in the water. McLeay and his team rebuilt the African Queen's century-old Brady steam engine and replating the hull and replacing over 100 pipes, sourcing parts mostly from the UK but also from within Uganda.

Gallery

References

External links
 
 Monroe County listings at National Register of Historic Places
 Monroe County listings at Florida's Office of Cultural and Historical Programs
https://www.theguardian.com/film/2014/jan/20/african-queen-boat-takes-tourists-back-on-nile
https://www.nzherald.co.nz/entertainment/news/article.cfm?c_id=1501119&objectid=11150624

National Register of Historic Places in Monroe County, Florida
Steamboats
Tourist attractions in the Florida Keys
Ships on the National Register of Historic Places in Florida
Riverboats